Ferraresi is an Italian surname. Notable people with the surname include:

Aldo Ferraresi (1902–1978), Italian classical violinist
Fabio Ferraresi (born 1979), Italian footballer
Jorge Ferraresi
Nahuel Ferraresi

Italian-language surnames